Thorndike or Thorndyke may refer to:

People 

Andrew Thorndike (1909–1979), a German film director
 Ashley Horace Thorndike (1871–1933), an American educator 
 Augustus Thorndike (1896–1986), an American physician 
 Edward Thorndike (1874–1949), a behavioral psychologist
 Elizabeth Thorndike (1632–1672), the second wife of John Proctor, daughter of John Thorndike
 Frances Cope (1902–1982), an American mathematician, daughter of Edward Thorndike
 Guillermo Thorndike (1940–2009), a Peruvian journalist and writer
 Helen Louise Thorndyke, pseudonym for the multiple authors of the Honey Bunch book series
 Herbert Thorndike (1598–1672), an English academic and clergyman
 Israel Thorndike (1755–1832), an American sailor, merchant, and politician
 John Thorndike (settler) (1611/12–1668), one of the founders of the Massachusetts Bay Colony, brother of Herbert Thorndike
 John Thorndike, (b. 1942), an American writer 
 Joseph J. Thorndike (1913–2005), an American editor and writer
 Lynn Thorndike (1882–1965), an American historian, brother of Ashley Horace Thorndike
 Robert L. Thorndike (1910–1990), an American psychologist, son of Edward Thorndike 
 Robert M. Thorndike (born 1943), an American psychologist, son of Robert L. Thorndike
 Russell Thorndike (1885–1972), a British actor and novelist, brother of Sybil Thorndike 
 Sybil Thorndike (1882–1976), a British actress
 W. L. Thorndyke, perpetrator of the Maggie Murphy hoax

Fictional characters
 Dr. Thorndyke, a fictional detective in novels by R. Austin Freeman
 Chris Thorndyke, a human boy in the Sonic X anime television series
 Key Thorndyke, fictional newspaper magnate in the 1948 film State of the Union (film)
 Peter Thorndyke, villain in the 1968 film The Love Bug
 Dr. Richard Thorndyke, main character in the 1977 film High Anxiety

Places 

 Thorndike, Maine, a town in the United States

Other
 Kennedy–Thorndike experiment
Thorndyke (TV series), a 1964 BBC television series